WHCO (1230 AM) is a country formatted broadcast radio station licensed to Sparta, Illinois, serving Sparta and Randolph County, Illinois.  WHCO is owned and operated by David and Carol Holder, through licensee Southern Illinois Radio Group, Inc.

History
WHCO began broadcasting in February 1955 and aired a country music format. It was owned by Hirsch Communication Engineering Corporation. By the early 1970s, the station was airing a middle of the road (MOR) format, along with 30 hours of country music a week. In the 1980s and 1990s, the station aired a full service format, with adult contemporary and country music, along with talk, farm, and religious programming. In 1998, the station adopted a news-talk format, carrying local programming as well as nationally syndicated hosts such as G. Gordon Liddy, Larry King, and Jim Bohannon. In 2008, WHCO returned to a country music format. In 2013, controlling interest in the station was sold to David and Carol Holder's Southern Illinois Radio Group, Inc. for $150,000.

Translator
In addition to the main station, WHCO is relayed by an FM translator.

References

External links
Real Country 1230 and 97.3 WHCO Online

HCO
Country radio stations in the United States
Radio stations established in 1955
1955 establishments in Illinois